"Against All Odds" is a collaborative single, recorded by British musicians and production team Chase & Status featuring vocals from British rapper Kano. The single was released on 23 February 2009 as the second single from Chase & Status' debut studio album, More Than Alot. "Against All Odds" contains samples from the 1967 song "Dead End Street" by Lou Rawls and a drum sample from "Apache" by Incredible Bongo Band. The music video for the track features Kano and Chase & Status in an underground nightclub in London.

"Against All Odds" was released as a double A-side single with the instrumental track "Saxon", which later went on to appear in the deluxe edition of More Than Alot. "Saxon" is a reggae-inspired dubstep song, as well as one of the few dubstep songs in the drum and bass album. Ironically, the instrumental contains heavy elements of the Metallica song "Wherever I May Roam", giving it its dark sound. The song also takes various vocal samples from the 1984 live project Coughing Up Fire!!!. The track's title refers to Saxon Studio International, the reggae sound system (group of MCs) being sampled from the project. "Saxon" is also the instrumental used in the Rihanna song "Red Lipstick" from the deluxe edition of her 2011 album Talk That Talk.

Track listing

Personnel
 Saul Milton – producer
 Will Kennard – producer
 Kano – vocals
 Mitchy Boy – artwork

Chart performance

Release history

References

2009 singles
Chase & Status songs
Kano (rapper) songs
Song recordings produced by Chase & Status
Songs written by Saul Milton
Songs written by Will Kennard
RAM Records singles
Songs with lyrics by Ben Raleigh
Trip hop songs
2008 songs
Songs written by Kano (rapper)